The Oakland Athletics' 1987 season involved the A's finishing 3rd in the American League West with a record of 81 wins and 81 losses. Mark McGwire set a rookie record by hitting 49 home runs. At the beginning of the season, the word "Athletics" returned, in script lettering, to the front of the team's jerseys. Former A's owner, Charles O. Finley banned the word "Athletics" from the club's name in the past because he felt that name was too closely associated with former Philadelphia Athletics owner Connie Mack. In his first full Major League season, Mark McGwire hit 49 home runs, a single-season record for a rookie; he was named the American League Rookie of the Year. McGwire would be the first American League rookie since Al Rosen of the Cleveland Indians in 1950 to lead the American League in home runs. The 1987 season also saw the return of Reggie Jackson to Oakland.

Offseason
 December 11, 1986: Donnie Hill was traded by the Athletics to the Chicago White Sox for Gene Nelson and Bruce Tanner.
 January 20, 1987: Vida Blue was signed as a free agent by the Athletics.
 January 22, 1987: Jim Eppard was purchased from the Athletics by the California Angels.
 February 6, 1987: Johnnie LeMaster was signed as a free agent with the Oakland Athletics.
 February 23, 1987: Jeff Kaiser was traded by the Athletics to the Cleveland Indians for Curt Wardle.

Regular season

Season standings

Record vs. opponents

Opening Day starters
Jose Canseco
Mike Davis
Alfredo Griffin
Reggie Jackson
Carney Lansford
Rob Nelson
Dwayne Murphy
Tony Phillips
Curt Young
Mickey Tettleton

Notable transactions
 April 3, 1987: Brian Guinn (minors), Dave Wilder (minors), and Mark Leonette (minors) were traded by the Athletics to the Chicago Cubs for Dennis Eckersley and Dan Rohn.
 April 27, 1987: Dennis Lamp was signed as a free agent by the Athletics.
 April 30, 1987: Bill Caudill was signed as a free agent by the Athletics.
 May 12, 1987: Brian Harper was signed as a free agent by the Athletics.
 June 29, 1987: Bill Mooneyham was traded by the Athletics to the Milwaukee Brewers for Russ McGinnis.
 July 29, 1987: Johnnie LeMaster was released by the Oakland Athletics.
 August 29, 1987: Tim Belcher was traded by the Athletics to the Los Angeles Dodgers for Rick Honeycutt.
 August 30, 1987: The Athletics traded players to be named later to the San Diego Padres for Storm Davis. The Athletics completed the deal by sending Dave Leiper to the Padres on August 31 and Rob Nelson to the Padres on September 8.
 August 31, 1987: Gary Lavelle was signed as a free agent by the Athletics.

Draft picks
 June 2, 1987: Ron Coomer was drafted by the Oakland Athletics in the 14th round of the 1987 amateur draft. Player signed June 6, 1987.
 June 2, 1987: Scott Brosius was drafted by the Athletics in the 20th round of the 1987 Major League Baseball Draft. Player signed June 9, 1987.

All-Star Game
The 1987 Major League Baseball All-Star Game was the 58th playing of the midsummer classic between the all-stars of the American League (AL) and National League (NL), the two leagues comprising Major League Baseball. The game was held on July 14, 1987, at the Oakland–Alameda County Coliseum in Oakland, California, the home of the Oakland Athletics of the American League. The game resulted in the National League defeating the American League 2-0 in 13 innings. Montreal Expos outfielder Tim Raines was named the Most Valuable Player.

Roster

Player stats

Batting

Starters by position
Note: Pos = Position; G = Games played; AB = At bats; H = Hits; Avg. = Batting average; HR = Home runs; RBI = Runs batted in; SB = Stolen bases

Other batters
Note: G = Games played; AB = At bats; R = Runs; H = Hits; Avg. = Batting average; HR = Home runs; RBI = Runs batted in; SB = Stolen bases

Pitching

Starting pitchers 
Note: G = Games pitched; IP = Innings pitched; W = Wins; L= Losses; ERA = Earned run average; CG = Complete games; SO = Strikeouts

Other pitchers 
Note: G = Games pitched; IP = Innings pitched; W = Wins; L = Losses; ERA = Earned run average; SO = Strikeouts

Relief pitchers 
Note: G = Games pitched; IP = Innings pitched; W = Wins; L = Losses; SV = Saves; ERA = Earned run average; SO = Strikeouts

Awards and records
 Mark McGwire, American League Rookie of the Year
 Mark McGwire, Rookie Record, Most Home Runs in One Season (49)
1987 MLB All-Star Game
 Mark McGwire, first base

McGwire's rookie record 49 home runs

Farm system

References

1987 Oakland Athletics team page at Baseball Reference
1987 Oakland Athletics team page at www.baseball-almanac.com

Oakland Athletics seasons
Oakland Athletics season
Oak